Boyacá State was one of the states of Colombia.

Naming 
 1857-06-15 created under the name Estado Federal de Boyacá (Federal State of Boyacá).
 1858 recognized as Estado de la Federación in the 1858 constitution of the Granadine Confederation,
 1863 Estado Soberano (Sovereign State of Boyacá) in 1863 constitution of the United States of Colombia.

References

States of Colombia
Sovereign States of the Granadine Confederation
1857 establishments in the Republic of New Granada
Geography of Arauca Department
Geography of Boyacá Department
Geography of Casanare Department
Muysccubun